Charles-Robert Faidide (19 January 1880 in Paris – 3 July 1907 in Le Kremlin-Bicêtre) was a French track and field athlete who competed at the 1900 Summer Olympics in Paris, France.

Faidide competed in the 400 metres. He placed third in his first-round (semifinals) heat and did not advance to the final.

References

External links

 De Wael, Herman. Herman's Full Olympians: "Athletics 1900". Accessed 18 March 2006.
 

Athletes (track and field) at the 1900 Summer Olympics
Olympic athletes of France
French male sprinters
1880 births
1907 deaths
Athletes from Paris